Lat Lum Kaeo is the westernmost district of Pathum Thani province, central Thailand.

History
The district was established on 28 March 1916.

Geography
Neighboring districts are (from the north clockwise): Lat Bua Luang of Phra Nakhon Si Ayutthaya province; Sam Khok and Mueang Pathum Thani of Pathum Thani province; and Pak Kret, Bang Bua Thong, and Sai Noi of Nonthaburi province.

Administration
The district is divided into seven sub-districts (tambons), which are further subdivided into 67 villages (mubans). Rahaeng is a sub-district municipality (thesaban tambon) and covers part of tambon Rahaeng. Each of the tambons has a Tambon administrative organization (TAO).

References

External links
amphoe.com (Thai)

Lat Lum Kaeo